Ulric Henry Ellerhusen (1879–1957) first name variously cited as Ulrich or Ulrik, surname sometimes cited as Ellerhousen) was a German-American sculptor and teacher best known for his architectural sculpture.

Ellerhusen was born on April 7, 1879 in Waren, Mecklenburg, Germany and came to the United States in 1894.  He studied at the Art Institute of Chicago under Lorado Taft, and under Gutzon Borglum and James Earle Fraser at the Art Students League of New York, and from 1906 through 1912 with Karl Bitter. In 1915, Ellerhusen contributed unusual inward-looking figural sculpture for the colonnade of Bernard Maybeck's Palace of Fine Arts, working under Bitter, who was the director of sculpture for the San Francisco Panama–Pacific International Exposition (1915).

In 1926 Ellerhusen worked with Lee Lawrie to produce about 70 integrated sculptural figures for the Rockefeller Chapel at the University of Chicago.  Lawrie was responsible for the figures below the 30-foot level of the building, and Ellerhusen for the higher and less visible work.    Ellerhusen's most notable contribution was the March of Religion, a series of fifteen monumental sized figures across the front gable.  Unlike what is found in most churches, the people represented were not just drawn from the Judeo-Christian tradition but included Zoroaster and Plato as well as Abraham, Moses, the Prophets, Elijah and Isaiah and John the Baptist.  Christ holds the center position. Next to him is Peter, then the Apostle Paul,  Athanasius, Augustine, Francis of Assisi, Martin Luther and John Calvin make up the remaining figures in the gable.  Elsewhere on the building Ellerhusen created figures of Amos, Hosea, John Huss, William Tyndale, St. Monica and St. Cecilia as well as the emblems for Matthew, Mark, Luke and John.
  
Ellerhusen returned to the University of Chicago in 1931 to execute a panel for over the main entrance to the Oriental Institute's new building.  This figures on this tympanum symbolize the passing of writing from the East to "vigorous  and aggressive figure of the West.".  The East is represented by a lion in the foreground with Zoser, Hammurabi, Thutmose III, Ashurbanipal, Darius the Great and Chosroes farther back.  The West has a bison as its totem while its great men are Herodotus, Alexander the Great, Julius Caesar, a crusader and two modern men, an excavator and an archeologist.  Various examples of the great buildings form the background of both sections.  The building picked to represent modern architecture is Goodhue's Nebraska State Capitol.

Although Ellerhusen and Lawrie worked together on several buildings it is only at Goodhue's Christ Church Cranbrook (1928) that it is difficult to determine who did what.  It is likely that each did several of the figures independently, but their styles are so similar, and in this case the figures representing such atypically ecclesiastical people as Wilbur Wright, Louis Pasteur, Michael Faraday, Galileo Galilei, Johannes Gutenberg, Leonardo da Vinci, Abraham Lincoln and George Washington are closer to Ellerhusen's more relaxed and naturalistic style than Lawrie's.

For the Louisiana State Capitol building Ellerhusen created "four colossal corner figures standing for 'four dominating spirits of a free and enlightened people,''' "  Law, Science, Art and Philosophy.     He also produced a frieze Louisiana: History and Life that is divided into five parts and wraps around the building at the fifth floor level.  In one section Ellerhusen used a son (Solis Seiferth, Jr.)  and a daughter (Carol Dreyfous)  of the building's architects as models for figures of children in his design.

Ellerhusen, a longtime member of the National Sculpture Society, taught throughout much of his career, and spent the final years of his life in Towaco, New Jersey, where he had founded an art school and taught alongside his wife Florence Cooney Ellerhusen, a landscape painter.
 

Gallery

 Selected works 

  Altar of Democracy (Peace Monument), East Orange, New Jersey, 1922
 Rockefeller Chapel at the University of Chicago, 1926
 Christ Church Cranbrook, Bloomfield Hills, Michigan, 1928
 Louisiana State Capitol, 1932
  Panels Atomic Energy and Stellar Energy on the facade of the Electrical Building at the Chicago Century of Progress Exposition, 1933
 First Permanent Settlement of the West (aka Pioneer Monument), Old Fort Harrod State Park, Harrodsburg, Kentucky, with architect Francis Keally, 1934
 Kansas City City Hall, 1936, friezes on the east and west walls
 Gold Man (aka Oregon Pioneer) finial figure on the Oregon State Capitol, with Keally, 1938

References

Kvaran and Lockley, Architectural Sculpture in America'', unpublished manuscript
Opitz, Glenn B, Editor, Mantle Fielding's Dictionary of American Painters, Sculptors & Engravers,  Apollo Book, Poughkeepsie NY, 1986

1879 births
1957 deaths
American architectural sculptors
American male sculptors
People from Montville, New Jersey
School of the Art Institute of Chicago alumni
Art Students League of New York alumni
20th-century American sculptors
National Sculpture Society members
Sculptors from New York (state)
20th-century American male artists